Winfield Heights, Alberta may refer to:

Winfield Heights, Parkland County, Alberta, a locality in Parkland County, Alberta
Winfield Heights, Strathcona County, a locality in Strathcona County, Alberta